Sorbus vilmorinii, the Vilmorin's rowan or Vilmorin's mountain ash, is a species of flowering plant in the family Rosaceae, native to Sichuan, Tibet and Yunnan in China.

The fruits, which can last through winter, are crimson, turning to pale pink. They are eaten by birds when there is no other food supply nearby.

The specific epithet vilmorinii refers to the 19th century French horticulturalist Maurice de Vilmorin.

It grows in a wide range of habitats (mountain slopes, roadsides, mixed forests along river banks, grasslands, bamboo thickets).

Sorbus vilmorinii was described based on a specimen in cultivation that was an apomictic microspecies. However, almost indistinguishable specimens are diploid and frequent in the wild. Also hybrids are common in the wild.

In cultivation, this plant provides a long season of interest as an elegant, compact tree which can be grown in smaller gardens. It has gained the Royal Horticultural Society's Award of Garden Merit.

Like all rowans the fruit can be cooked and used to make bitter jellies or marmalades.

References

External links
Sorbus vilmorinii info
Sorbus vilmorinii picture
Sorbus vilmorinii information

vilmorinii
Endemic flora of China
Trees of China
Ornamental trees